General Terrell may refer to:

Alexander W. Terrell (1827–1912), Confederate States Army brigadier general (assignment not confirmed)
Henry Terrell Jr. (1890–1971), U.S. Army major general
James B. Terrill (1838–1864), Confederate States Army brigadier general
William R. Terrill (1834–1862), Union Army brigadier general

See also
Attorney General Terrell (disambiguation)